Calamagrostis steyermarkii is a species of grass in the family Poaceae. It is found only in Ecuador.

References

steyermarkii
Flora of Ecuador
Vulnerable plants
Taxonomy articles created by Polbot